Sumitra Hazarika is an Indian activist. She was born in a village near to Titabor in Assam, India. She was married to Manindra Gogoi until his death in 2015 and was sister-in-law to Bhupen Hazarika. She is president of the Mission for Integration, Gender Equalization, Harmony and Fight against Threat (MIGHT). She also works for the Assam State Commission for Women. In 2022, she filed a first information report (FIR) against politician Sherman Ali Ahmed regarding his televised comments on rape. In recognition of her achievements, Hazarika received the Nari Shakti Puraskar on 8 March 2017 from President Pranab Mukherjee. She also was awarded the Prag Perona in 2018.

References 

Women from Assam
Year of birth missing (living people)
Nari Shakti Puraskar winners
Indian activists
Living people